Josè Fossa (1902 – 9 October 1967) was an Argentine footballer. He played in one match for the Argentina national football team in 1927. He was also part of Argentina's squad for the 1927 South American Championship.

References

External links
 

1902 births
1967 deaths
Argentine footballers
Argentina international footballers
Place of birth missing
Association football midfielders
San Lorenzo de Almagro footballers
Argentine football managers
San Lorenzo de Almagro managers